Freds Mountain is a summit located in Adirondack Mountains of New York located in the Town of Wells southeast of the hamlet of Wells.

References

Mountains of Hamilton County, New York
Mountains of New York (state)